Jane de Almeida, born in Para de Minas, Brazil, is a researcher, director, artist, curator and theoretician.

Biography
Raised in Minas Gerais de Almeida started to study psychology and cinematography in Belo Horizonte. Currently she is based in São Paulo, Brazil.

de Almeida works belong in the following categories: experimental film, video art, contemporary art and computer art.

de Almeida is an interdisciplinary researcher, professor and independent curator. She has published several articles and book chapters such as “On Elephants, Telescopes, Microscopes, Cartography, Aliens, and Computers: Notes on Scalability in Alexander Kluge’s Works” In: Stichwort: Kooperation. Keiner ist alleine schlau genug (Alexander Kluge-Jahrbuch, Verlag, 2017), “The dot and the line” for A companion to Contemporary Drawing (Wiley, 2020) and organized the books CineGrid: cinematic futures (Cinusp, 2017) and Harun Farocki: Programming the Visible (bilingual, Cinusp, 2018) with articles by Thomas Elsaesser, Erika Balsom, Alfredo Suppia, Harun Farocki, Patricia Moran among others. She curated the first 4K films exhibition in Brazil at the FILE (Electronic Language International Festival) and organized the first transmission from Latin America to the US (UCSD) and Japan (Keio University) of a 4k film over a 10 Gbit/s photonic network at FILE 2009 Transcontinental. Currently she coordinates the Advanced Visualization Working Group (Content) for the Brazilian National Education and Research Network (RNP). Jane is the director of the short films 2014k (4k 3D, 2010, 10 mins) screened at Casa Brasil during the FIFA Soccer World Cup in Johannesburg and San Diego), StereoEssays: Five or Six Essays in Search of a Narrative (4k 3D, 2011, 16 min), which has been exhibited in venues such as the Maison de L’Amérique Latine in Paris, CineGrid in San Diego, the Sesc Film Festival of Arts in São Paulo and the Tecnofagias Art Exhibition (in loop for 2 months) at the Tomie Ohtake Institute for Contemporary Art. She has also directed the short films Openmouthed (4k, 2014, 3 mins), The Diving (4k, 2014, 2 mins) and Pixel Race (4k, 2015, 9 mins), which were screened at CineGrid in San Diego and Tokyo. She was co-scriptwriter for the films 500 Souls (2004, with several national and international awards) and Invenção de Limite (awarded with the Hubert Bals Fund). She directed the film-essay LOGA - Mars Projections about the planet Mars and the 3D city-symphony film StereoEssays São Paulo. Jane holds a Ph.D. in Communication and Semiotics.

de Almeida followed her artistic career using a large variety of film materials, forms and techniques: installation, film and video.

Research and teaching
de Almeida has taught at numerous universities and cultural centers, among others at the University of California, San Diego in San Diego, at the São Paulo Museum of Art and at Mackenzie Presbyterian University, in São Paulo, Brazil. Jane de Almeida was artist in residence at the Arthur C. Clarke Center for Human Imagination, Visiting Fellow in the Department of History of Art and Architecture at Harvard University (2005), visiting scholar in the Department of Philosophy at Boston College (1999), guest researcher at Medialab-Prado (2006), visiting scholar in the Department of Communication and lecturer in the Visual Arts Department at University of California, San Diego (2007/2008/2018).

Curatorial activities 
de Almeida curated art exhibitions and film festivals for art spaces, galleries and museums such as Off the Radar at University of California, San Diego Visual Arts Gallery, Harun Farocki: Programming the Visible at Paço das Artes, Ulla, Ulla, Martians! at Casanova Gallery, the Dziga Vertov Group, Alexander Kluge: the fifth act, Metacinemas and Aisthesis at Centro Cultural Banco do Brasil, accompanied with catalogs or comprehensive books.

Selected bibliography

 The dot and the line. Drawing amongst computers. In: A Companion to Contemporary Drawing. London, Wiley, 2020.
 Harun Farocki: programming the visible. São Paulo, CINUSP, 2018.
 On Elephants, Telescopes, Microscopes, Cartography, Aliens, and Computers: Notes on Scalability in Alexander Kluge’s Works. In: Stichwort: Kooperation. Keiner ist alleine schlau genug (Alexander Kluge-Jahrbuch, Verlag, 2017).  
 CineGrid: cinematic futures. São Paulo, CINUSP, 2017.   
 Interview with Yve-Alain Bois  
 Interview with Jean-Pierre Gorin
 Alexander Kluge: o quinto ato. São Paulo, CosacNaify, 2007.
 Dziga Vertov Group. São Paulo, witz edições, 2005.

Films

 Loga - Mars Projections
 StereoEssays Rio de Janeiro
 StereoEssays São Paulo
 Openmouthed (4k, 2014, 3 mins)
 The Diving (4k, 2014, 2 mins)
 Pixel Race (4k, 2015, 9 mins)
 500 Souls (scriptwriter)

Decorations and awards
 1994: Hubert Bals Fund

External links
 Website of Jane de Almeida
 Jane de Almeida at University of California
 Laboratory of Scientific Image at UNICAMP
 Laboratory of Cinematic Arts and Visualization
 Ulla, Ulla, Ulla, Ulla! Martians, Aliens, Intergalactics and Humans exhibition article by Bruce Sterling for Wired (magazine).
 Jane de Almeida at Itaú Cultural Encyclopedia

1964 births
Living people
People from Minas Gerais
Brazilian people of Portuguese descent
Harvard University alumni
Brazilian film directors
Brazilian experimental filmmakers